Rahim Shah; born 12 December 1975) is a Pakistani Pashtun pop singer composer and music producer. 

He sings primarily in  Pashto, however he has also created songs in Urdu and Punjabi.

Early life
Rahim Shah was born on April 3, 1975. A Pashtun (Yusufzai tribe) with his father coming from Swat. However, he was reportedly raised and educated in Karachi.

In an interview he revealed that Rahim Shah is not his real name and, in fact, it is his elder brother's name. He recently disclosed his original name, which is Muhammad Rahim, on ARY Qtv.

Career
Rahim Shah's solo career began in the late 1990s with successful singles. Ghum album containing the single Pehle Toh Kabhi Kabhi Ghum Tha was particularly successful.

Audience in India
Shah attracted the attention of Indian audience with his 1999 song Pehle Toh Kabhi Kabhi Ghum Tha.  

According to a major English-language newspaper in Pakistan, "Ghum is not Rahim Shah's personal composition. It is a Pashtun folk song or tappa, sung by famous Pashtun singer, Haroon Bacha. Rahim Shah translated the "tappa" into Urdu and changed the arrangement." This was later re-copied by Indian singer Altaf Raja.

Discography

Albums
 Ghum (1999)
 Sadma Bewafa Ka (2000)
 Saba Ru (2001)
 Laila
 O Peera
 Jhoola (playground swing) (song dedicated to Rahim Shah's mother, also written by him)
 Channa (2003)
 Pyar Nahin Milta (2004)
 Yarana (2005)
 Charcha (2007)
 Maa'ma Dey (September 2009)
 Hello Hum Lallann Bol Rahe Hain (2010)
 Gul Jana (2011)
 Bad Times (TV Series) (2014)

Film career
 Pakistani film Yeh Dil Aap Ka Huwa (2002) (playback singer)
 In 2011, Rahim Shah announced at Peshawar Press Club that he would play a lead role in a Pashto language film which would also depict the true Pakhtun culture.

In June 2020, Rahim Shah tested positive for COVID-19, self-isolated himself and asked his followers to pray for his fast recovery.

References

External links
 

1975 births
Living people
Pakistani pop singers
People from Swat District
Singers from Karachi
Pashtun people
Pashto-language singers
Punjabi-language singers
Pakistani playback singers
Urdu-language singers